Long Road Home is a 1991 American drama television film directed by John Korty, based on the 1988 novel of the same name by Ronald B. Taylor. The film stars Mark Harmon, Lee Purcell, Morgan Weisser, Leon Russom, and Timothy Owen Waldrip. It revolves around a migrant farm worker who struggles to keep his family alive during the Depression of the 1930s. The film received two Primetime Emmy Award nominations for the performances of Purcell and Russom.

Cast
 Mark Harmon as Ertie Robertson
 Lee Purcell as Bessie Robertson
 Morgan Weisser as Jake Robertson
 Leon Russom as Titus Wardlow
 Timothy Owen Waldrip as James Earl
 Vinessa Shaw as Clara Tarpin
 Bianca Rose as Susie Robertson
 Kathryn Morris as Billy Jo Robertson
 Sarah Lundy as Mary Ellen Robertson
 Ronnie Dee Blaire as Elijah Parsons
 Sydney Walker as Kleindecker
 Edward Ivory as Barkham
 Morgan Upton as Bull
 Jim Zubiena as Cletus Sharp
 Donald A. Mercier as Windy
 Rider Strong as Benjy Robertson
 Paul Henri as Will Henry
 Don West as Alf Young
 Ron Kaell as Checker
 Cab Covay as Hammer

Reception
Entertainment Weekly television critic Ken Tucker wrote that "director John Korty has made a limp, self-pitying little TV movie here, and the script by Jane-Howard Hammerstein is so full of vague grandiloquence that even some of the characters don't understand what's being said." Wilborn Hampton of The New York Times described the film as "a fairy-tale view not only of the Great Depression, but of the labor movement it spawned and the way its victims survived." Ray Loynd of the Los Angeles Times called it the "Best Production Based on a Novel" among 1991 drama television films which he saw.

Awards and nominations

References

External links
 
 

1991 films
1991 drama films
1991 television films
1990s American films
1990s English-language films
American drama television films
NBC network original films
Great Depression films
Films about families
Films about farmers
Films based on American novels
Films directed by John Korty
Films scored by Craig Safan
Films set in 1937
Films set in 1938
Films set in California
Films shot in California
Television films based on books
Works about internal migrations in the United States